Vincent Burke (14 February 1952 – 17 February 2022) was a New Zealand television and film producer. Burke was the founder of Top Shelf Productions which was established in 1988. With a career spanning thirty years, Burke was noted for his documentary work and television productions which addressed social issues and everyday life.

Early life and education 
Burke was born in Waimate, in the South Island of New Zealand. His family moved to Tokoroa when he was ten and later to Hamilton.  He attended Hamilton Boys' High School and Victoria University graduating with a BA (Hons) in music. After that he grew an interest in research and arts management.

Career 
With his work arranging tours for theatre groups and bands for various universities and working as an arts administrator, Burke joined the NZ Film Commission as a policy advisor and researcher.

Burke launched the New Zealand Television production company, Top Shelf Productions in 1988 which he ran until closing it down in 2019. He raised his own finance in the company to fund his first short film, Gordon Bennett, which was released in 1989.

Burke’s first documentary, I Want to Die at Home was released in 1990. He made seven more films about death and dying which were used in nurses' training. The documentary won a Jury Award at the Montreal Women’s Festival in 1991. All About Eve, a documentary about the HIV-infected child Eve van Grafhorst was released in 1994.

In 1995, Cinema of Unease was released which covers the beginnings of New Zealand films around this time. Burke was the executive producer and it won Best Documentary at the 1996 NZ Film Awards.

During the 1990s Burke expanded further with Top Shelf Productions, producing shows and documentaries such as Target, An Immigrant Nation and Flatmates. During the early 2000s, Top Shelf Productions released the show Making New Zealand. 

Burke and Laurie Clarke founded the free-to-air New Zealand TV Channel, Choice TV in late 2011. In 2012, Burke was appointed one of the directors and the channel was launched on 28 April 2012. It was sold to Blue Ant Media in 2014, then to Discovery in 2019.

In the last few years of his life Burke worked as an executive producer at the Avalon studios in Lower Hutt.

Selected credits 

 Gordon Bennett (1989)
 I Want To Die At Home (1990)
 Sisters of the River (1992)
 An Immigrant Nation (1994-1996)
 All About Eve (1994)
 Flight of the Albatross (1995)
 Velvet Dreams (1997)
 Flatmates (1997)
 Target (1999-2012)
 Frontier of Dreams (2003-2004)
 100 Men (2017)
 TEAM TIBET - Home away from Home (2017)

Personal life 
Burke was married to, and later divorced from, Monique Oomen who was a TVNZ current affairs director. He died on 17 February 2022.

References 

1952 births
2022 deaths
New Zealand television producers
New Zealand film producers
People from Waimate
People educated at Hamilton Boys' High School
Victoria University of Wellington alumni